Target  is a 1979 Italian-Turkish  "poliziottesco" film written and directed  by Guido Zurli and starring Luc Merenda.

Plot

Cast

Luc Merenda as Inspector Keaton 
Gabriella Giorgelli as  Jasmine
Kadir İnanır as  Gengis 
Paola Senatore as Gangster's lover
Pamela Villoresi as  Gengis’ wife
 Giuseppe Colombo as  Head of the criminal gang
Tanju Gürsu as Şinasi

References

External links

1970s crime action films
Poliziotteschi films
Films scored by Stelvio Cipriani
Turkish crime action films
Italian multilingual films
Turkish multilingual films

1979 multilingual films
1970s Italian films